Human-in-the-loop  or HITL is used in multiple contexts. It can be defined as a model requiring human interaction. HITL is associated with modeling and simulation (M&S) in the live, virtual, and constructive taxonomy. HITL along with the related human-on-the-loop are also used in relation to lethal autonomous weapons. Further, HITL is used in the context of machine learning.

Machine learning

Simulation
In simulation, HITL models may conform to human factors requirements as in the case of a mockup.  In this type of simulation a human is always part of the simulation and consequently influences the outcome in such a way that is difficult if not impossible to reproduce exactly.  HITL also readily allows for the identification of problems and requirements that may not be easily identified by other means of simulation.

HITL is often referred to as interactive simulation, which is a special kind of physical simulation in which physical simulations include human operators, such as in a flight or a driving simulator.

Benefits
Human-in-the-loop allows the user to change the outcome of an event or process.  HITL is extremely effective for the purposes of training because it allows the trainee to immerse themselves in the event or process  .  The immersion effectively contributes to a positive transfer of acquired skills into the real world.  This can be demonstrated by trainees utilizing flight simulators in preparation to become pilots.

HITL also allows for the acquisition of knowledge regarding how a new process may affect a particular event. Utilizing HITL allows participants to interact with realistic models and attempt to perform as they would in an actual scenario. HITL simulations bring to the surface issues that would not otherwise be apparent until after a new process has been deployed.  A real-world example of HITL simulation as an evaluation tool is its usage by the Federal Aviation Administration (FAA) to allow air traffic controllers to test new automation procedures by directing the activities of simulated air traffic while monitoring the effect of the newly implemented procedures.

As with most processes, there is always the possibility of human error, which can only be reproduced using HITL simulation.  Although much can be done to automate systems, humans typically still need to take the information provided by a system to determine the next course of action based on their judgment and experience. Intelligent systems can only go so far in certain circumstances to automate a process; only humans in the simulation can accurately judge the final design.  Tabletop simulation may be useful in the very early stages of project development for the purpose of collecting data to set broad parameters, but the important decisions require human-in-the-loop simulation.

Within virtual simulation taxonomy 
Virtual simulations inject HITL in a central role by exercising motor control skills (e.g. flying an airplane), decision making skills (e.g. committing fire control resources to action), or communication skills (e.g. as members of a C4I team).

Examples
Flight simulators
Driving simulators
Marine simulators
Certain video games
 Supply chain management simulators
 Digital puppetry

Misconceptions
Although human-in-the-loop simulation can include a computer simulation in the form of a synthetic environment, computer simulation is not necessarily a form of human-in-the-loop simulation, and is often considered as human-out-of-the loop simulation. In this particular case, a computer model’s behavior is modified according to a set of initial parameters. The results of the model differ from the results stemming from a true human-in-the-loop simulation because the results can easily be replicated time and time again, by simply providing identical parameters.

Weapons
In discussion of autonomous weapons systems, HITL means that a human must instigate the action of the weapon (in other words not fully autonomous). This is contrasted with human-on-the-loop, where a human may abort an action, and human-out-of-the-loop, where no human action is involved. These classifications were laid out by Bonnie Docherty in a 2012 Human Rights Watch report.

See also

Humanistic Intelligence, which is intelligence that arises by having the human in the feedback loop of the computational process

References

Military technology
Military terminology
Military simulation
Emerging technologies